Ferdinando de Rojas or Ferdinando de Roxas (15 April 1650 – 30 December 1685) was a Roman Catholic prelate who served as Bishop of Vigevano (1683–1685).

Biography
Ferdinando de Rojas was born in Curiel, Spain and ordained a priest on 1 September 1675.
On 7 April 1683, he was selected as Bishop of Vigevano and confirmed by Pope Innocent XI on 20 December 1683. 
On 27 December 1683, he was consecrated bishop by Alessandro Crescenzi (cardinal), Cardinal-Priest of Santa Prisca, with Pier Antonio Capobianco, Bishop of Lacedonia, and Costanzo Zani, Bishop of Imola, serving as co-consecrators. 
He served as Bishop of Vigevano until his death on 30 December 1685.

References

External links and additional sources
 (for Chronology of Bishops) 
 (for Chronology of Bishops) 

17th-century Italian Roman Catholic bishops
Bishops appointed by Pope Innocent XI
1650 births
1685 deaths